Brett Olson or Olsen may refer to:

Sportsmen
 Brett Olson (born 1980), American basketball forward with the 2002–03 Kansas Jayhawks men's basketball team
 Brett Olson (ice hockey) (born 1987), American professional ice hockey forward
 Brett Olson (born 1992), American basketball guard with the  2011–12, 2012–13, 2013–14 and 2014–15 Denver Pioneers men's basketball teams

Others
 Brett Olson, Republican nominee for the Washington House of Representatives elections, 2006
Brett Olsen, honoured for his role in Trolley Square shooting
Brett Olsen (Cardfight!! Vanguard), fictional character